The Fishers Island Club is a country club located near the eastern end of Fishers Island in New York. The club includes an eighteen-hole golf course designed by Seth Raynor that was ranked ninth in the 2009 Golf Digest list of America's 100 Greatest Golf Courses.

The golf course has been called the "Cypress Point of the East" and is also referred to by its members as "The Big Club" to distinguish it from the Hay Harbor Club, another country club on the western part of the island with a nine-hole golf course. The course opened in July 1926, a few months after the death of its architect, Seth Raynor. Most of the holes have water views of Block Island Sound or Fishers Island Sound. Like his mentor Charles B. Macdonald, Raynor patterned many of the holes after classic designs at other courses including the Alps, Biarritz, Cape, Double Plateau, Eden, Punchbowl, Redan and Short.

The country club also has four tennis courts and a beach club.

References

External links
Fishers Island Club on Golf Club Atlas

Golf clubs and courses in New York (state)
Southold, New York
1926 establishments in New York (state)
Golf clubs and courses designed by Seth Raynor
Sports venues in Suffolk County, New York